Redmayne is an English surname. Notable people with the surname include:

Andrew Redmayne (born 1989), Australian football (soccer) player
Arthur Redmayne (1857–1933), English-born New Zealand cricketer who played for Canterbury
Eddie Redmayne (born 1982), English actor
George Redmayne Murray (1865–1939), English physician who pioneered in the treatment of endocrine disorders
Georgia Redmayne (born 1993), Australian cricketer
Henry Redmayne Holme (1839–1891), Anglican bishop in the late 19th century
Martin Redmayne, Baron Redmayne (1910–1983), British Conservative politician
Richard Redmayne (1865–1955), British civil and mining engineer

See also
Redmayne Baronets of Rushcliffe in the County of Nottingham, a title in the Baronetage of the United Kingdom
Yealand Redmayne, village and civil parish in the English county of Lancashire
Radman (disambiguation)
Readman
Redman (disambiguation)
Redmann
Redmen (disambiguation)
Redmine
Redmon (disambiguation)
Redmain (disambiguation)

English-language surnames